Sara Adler (née Levitskaya, some sources give Levitsky or Levitzky; 26 May 1858 – 28 April 1953) was a Russian-born Jewish actress in Yiddish theater who made her career mainly in the United States.

She was the third wife of Jacob Adler and the mother of prominent actors Luther and Stella Adler, and lesser-known actors Jay, Julia, Frances, and Florence Adler. The most famous of her 300 or so leading roles was the redeemed prostitute Katusha Maslova in Jacob Gordin's play based on Tolstoy's Resurrection.

Biography
She was born to merchant parents, Ellye and Pessye Levitzky, in Odessa, Russian Empire (currently in Ukraine). She grew up speaking Russian, only learning Yiddish through her participation in Yiddish theater.

In Russia, she married Maurice Heine (born Haimovitz), leader of a Yiddish theater troupe. After the 1883 ban on Yiddish theater in Imperial Russia, Maurice and Sara Heine left in 1884 for New York City. They had two sons, Joseph and Max Heine. Jacob Adler recorded that when she first performed at his London theater around 1886, "she spoke no Yiddish ... but came out before the curtain and sang Russian songs".

In 1890, Maurice and Sara divorced, and in 1891 she married Jacob Adler, himself recently divorced from a brief second marriage to Dinah Shtettin. She and Adler would be among the most prominent actors in Yiddish theater in New York for the next three decades. Both she and Jacob starred in the 1908 play The Worthless written by Jacob Gordin.  In 1911, she appeared in Gordin's play Elisha Ben Abuyah (originally staged in 1906). In 1914, she starred in the silent film Sins of the Parents directed by Ivan Abramson. The film was one of only two movies in which she appeared. After her husband's 1920 stroke and 1926 death, she performed only infrequently.

Although probably most remembered for her lead roles opposite her husband, Sara Adler also set out on her own with the Novelty Theater in Brooklyn, where she presented (in Yiddish) works of Ibsen and Shaw well before they were familiar to an English-language audience. She also presented works of the French feminist Eugène Brieux. After Rudolph Schildkraut quarreled with Max Reinhardt in Vienna, Sara Adler brought him to Brooklyn to play the husband in Jacob Gordin's stage adaptation of Leo Tolstoy's The Kreutzer Sonata. That production also included Jacob Ben-Ami (associated with the Vilna Troupe, as well as Adler offspring Stella and Luther Adler (Adler, 1999, 361 (commentary)).

Adler died in New York City.

References

Readings
 Adler, Jacob, A Life on the Stage: A Memoir, translated and with commentary by Lulla Rosenfeld, Knopf, New York, 1999, . 266, passim.
 Adler, Sara, on the Encyclopædia Britannica Women in American History site. Retrieved February 22, 2005.

External links
 Judith Laikin Elkin, Sara Adler, Jewish Women Encyclopedia
 Sara Adler, American National Biography, 
 
 
 

1858 births
1953 deaths
Actors from Odesa
People from Odessky Uyezd
Odesa Jews
Jews from the Russian Empire
Emigrants from the Russian Empire to the United States
American people of Ukrainian-Jewish descent
Jewish American actresses
Yiddish theatre performers
American stage actresses
19th-century American actresses
20th-century American actresses
American film actresses